Cherien Dabis (born 1976) is an American actress, director, producer, and screenwriter. She was named one of Variety magazine's 10 Directors to Watch in 2009, and in 2010 received a United States Artists (USA) Fellowship. In 2022, she was nominated for the Outstanding Directing For A Comedy Series award for her work on the television series Only Murders in the Building. In March 2022, Dabis was named Laureate for Cultural Excellence by the TAKREEM foundation, for her work on authentic Arab representation in Hollywood.

Early life
Dabis was born in Omaha, Nebraska. Her father is a physician of Palestinian descent, and her mother is from Salt, Jordan.

She grew up in the small town of Celina, Ohio, and spent many of her summers in Jordan. Dabis at 8 visited Palestine for the first time. She and her family were held at the Israeli border for 12 hours, and she was strip-searched along with her sisters. This incident would make her understand "what it meant to be Palestinian". She would not return to Palestine until 20 years later.

Back in the US, Dabis' hometown was populated predominantly by middle-class families from German backgrounds. Upon her return from trips to the Middle East, she would be asked if there were telephones and cars back in Jordan. As a Palestinian American, Dabis refused to be seen as an outsider, and instead chose to assimilate to the culture she found herself within. However, when the Gulf War commenced in 1990, things changed for her and her family. Her father lost many of his patients, her mother was called an "Arab bitch", and her family began receiving death threats. Although Dabis has no brothers, a rumor began that her father's "son" was fighting in Saddam Hussein's army. It is also at this time that her family was investigated by the Secret Service because of a rumor that claimed her sister had threatened to kill George H. W. Bush, who was the president at the time.

It is following these incidents that Dabis claims she faced an identity crisis, wherein she became aware of the fact that she was an "Arab in America". These events would go on to influence her desire to create films. She was 14 years old when she realized that no one was accurately portraying the lives of Arabs in America. She saw a great need to change the way in which Arabs were portrayed in the media. Years later, she would take filmmaking at Columbia University, and make films that represent her experiences as an Arab American, with a goal of changing the negative stereotypes in the film industry that contributed to the racism she experienced.

Education 
Dabis received her B.A. with honors in creative writing and communications from the University of Cincinnati and her M.F.A. in film from Columbia University School of the Arts in 2004.

Career

Film
Dabis defines herself as a humanist, and describes in her words, "after years spent working in Washington, D.C., I realized that I could reach more people and affect more change through fiction than politics." She believes the medium is a powerful tool when discussing various issues. She says that because she was raised between the Middle East and the Mid-West, she has a unique perspective, one that she wanted to represent in her films. As a result, her films are somewhat autobiographical, and the influences drawn from her own personal life are quite evident.  And so, her films take on themes of immigration, discrimination, cultural assimilation, and family. Her two first feature films complement one another, and as Dabis puts it, the two "complete a diptych". Amreeka was about being Arab in America, and May in The Summer was about being American in the Middle East. The two films represent the merging, and often clashing, of two separate worlds.

Her first short film, Make a Wish, premiered at the 2007 Sundance Film Festival and received awards at other festivals. She was a writer with the television series, The L Word from 2006 to 2008.

Dabis made her feature film debut with Amreeka which premiered at the 2009 Sundance Film Festival. The film also opened to critical praise other important venues. The DVD for Amreeka was released on January 12, 2010 with Make a Wish.

Dabis' second feature film May in the Summer screened at the opening night of the 2013 Sundance Film Festival.

Dabis has two upcoming projects. One will reportedly not tie into her middle-eastern roots and will be a comedy of sorts. The other will be in Arabic, and will in fact be set in Palestine.

Amreeka 
Amreeka was Dabis' debut feature film and she says it is "loosely based on things that happened to us during the first Gulf War". It recounts the story of Muna Farah, a Palestinian divorcee, and her son, Fadi. Muna works in the West Bank, and must pick up her son after school every day. In order to get home, they must cross an Israeli Checkpoint where they are harassed. One day, Muna discovers that she has been awarded a green card though the lottery. Fed up with her living situation, she decides to pack up and leave to the U.S. with her son. The film is set following the invasion of Iraq in 2003, and so the pair have some trouble at customs. After discovering that a cookie box containing her life savings has gone missing at the airport, Muna decides she needs to find a job. However, her many qualifications do not secure her a high paying job, and so she has no choice but to accept a position at white castle. Alongside this hardship, Muna also finds out that her family is facing a great deal of discrimination within the post 9-11 and Iraq War context. Her family receives threats, and her brother-in-law loses patients. Later on, Fadi gets into a fight at school with other children who are influenced by the information they are getting from the media. His classmates even go so far as to come to White Castle, and make scathing remarks to Muna, who ends up hurting herself after slipping on a drink poured by one of the kids. When Fadi is arrested after causing a fight following this incident, his principal Mr. Novatski speaks on his behalf and gets him released. The film ends with Muna inviting Mr. Novatski to dinner, and everyone sings and dances. The story mirrors the harsh reality many immigrants must face.

May in The Summer 
May in the Summer was Dabis' second feature film and was shot on location in Jordan, where she spent her own summers. Not only did she write, direct, and produce the film, but this was also her acting debut. The story follows May Brennan, a successful author from New York City who is engaged to Ziad. The two plan to marry in her hometown of Amman. When she does arrive to Jordan, her mother Nadine, a born-again Christian, vehemently disapproves of the fact that May is planning on marrying a Muslim man. Her younger sisters Dalia and Yasmine are also a handful. Her estranged father Edward also decides to show up and wants to make amends. As her wedding day gets closer, May has to deal with more issues from her past, as she must remember the painful details of her parents' divorce. May in The Summer is a story about the reconciliation of modern and traditional values.

Television 
Dabis began her career as a writer on the popular television show The L Word.  She has also directed episodes of Ramy, Ozark, The Sinner, and Only Murders in the Building.

Personal life 
Dabis is based in New York City. She is bisexual.

Inspiration 
Dabis grew up watching Egyptian movies. Her family had a vast VHS collection of Egyptian films and she describes them as the beginning of her education in film. E.T and The Wizard of Oz are American films that affected her perception of what films could strive to be. She also mentions Mike Leigh, John Cassavetes, and Robert Altman as personal influences, as well as films such as The 400 Blows, Bicycle Thieves, Ali: Fear Eats the Soul, A Woman Under the Influence, Working Girl, Midnight Cowboy and In the Mood for Love. She considers this final film to perhaps be her favorite of all time.

Filmography

Awards

See also 
 List of female film and television directors
 List of LGBT-related films directed by women

References

External links

1976 births
Living people
American film directors
American women film directors
American women screenwriters
LGBT film directors
LGBT television directors
LGBT film producers
LGBT television producers
American LGBT screenwriters
Palestinian film directors
Palestinian film producers
Palestinian screenwriters
American people of Palestinian descent
Writers from Omaha, Nebraska
Columbia University School of the Arts alumni
University of Cincinnati alumni
LGBT people from Nebraska
21st-century American LGBT people
21st-century American women
American women television directors
American television directors
American bisexual writers